Anisodes porphyropis is a moth in the family Geometridae first described by Edward Meyrick in 1888. It is found in Australia and Fiji.

References

Moths described in 1888
Sterrhinae